Shukurov is a surname. Notable people with the surname include:

Alibay Shukurov (born 1977), Azerbaijani athlete
Adil Shukurov, Azerbaijani footballer
Mahir Shukurov, Azerbaijani footballer
Nadir Shukurov, Azerbaijani footballer
Otabek Shukurov, Uzbek footballer
Shirin Shukurov, Azerbaijani soldier